The Legend of Zelda: Oracle of Seasons and The Legend of Zelda: Oracle of Ages are two action-adventure games in The Legend of Zelda series, developed by Flagship (a subsidiary of Capcom). They were released in 2001 for Nintendo's Game Boy Color handheld console and re-released on the Virtual Console for the Nintendo 3DS in 2013. They were also added to the Nintendo Switch Online service in 2023.

The player controls the protagonist Link from an overhead perspective. In Seasons, the Triforce transports Link to the land of Holodrum, where he sees Onox kidnap Din, the Oracle of Seasons. In Ages, the Triforce transports Link to Labrynna, where Veran possesses Nayru. The main plot is revealed once the player finishes both games. Link is armed with a sword and shield as well as a variety of secondary weapons and items for battling enemies and solving puzzles. The central items are the Rod of Seasons, which controls the seasons in Holodrum, and the Harp of Ages, which lets Link travel through time in Labrynna. Before he can infiltrate Onox's castle and Veran's tower, Link must collect the eight Essences of Nature and the eight Essences of Time, which are hidden in dungeons and guarded by bosses.

After experimenting with porting the original Legend of Zelda to the Game Boy Color, the Flagship team, supervised by Yoshiki Okamoto, began developing three interconnected Zelda games that could be played in any order. The complexity of this system led the team to cancel one game. Both Seasons and Ages were a critical success, and sold 3.96 million units each. Critics complimented the gameplay, colorful designs and graphic quality, but criticized the inconsistent sound quality.

Both games have been re-released on the Nintendo Switch Online service in 2023.

Gameplay

The gameplay of Oracle of Seasons and Ages is similar to that of The Legend of Zelda: Link's Awakening (1993) for Game Boy, copying basic controls, graphics, and sounds. Like most Legend of Zelda games, exploration and combat take place from an overhead perspective. Link uses a sword for his primary attack, complemented by secondary weapons and items. Basic items such as bombs and a boomerang are common to both games. Other items are exclusive to one game, with a counterpart in the other (e.g., the slingshot in Seasons and the seed shooter in Ages both shoot seeds, while the magnetic gloves in Seasons and the switch hook in Ages are used to access otherwise unreachable areas).  Unlike most Zelda games, a sword and shield is not always equipped when the player possesses them; they can be assigned like any other item into either of two available slots. Most of each of the games is spent finding the eight Essences hidden in dungeons—large, usually underground, areas containing enemies and puzzles. Each dungeon culminates with a boss that guards the Essence.

When not in a dungeon, Link explores the overworld. In Seasons, the overworld consists of Holodrum and the subterranean world of Subrosia inhabited by the dwarf-like Subrosian people. The two worlds are linked by several portals. In Ages, Link travels between present-day Labrynna and the past, connected by Time Holes. In either game, some areas of one world are accessible only from portals from the other and vice versa. Holodrum, Subrosia, and Labrynna contain optional side quests and upgrades for Link and his equipment. One such side quest is ring collection. Rings provide Link with various bonuses and abilities, such as improved defense. Other rings have no practical uses or effects, e.g. rings that weaken Link's attack or defense, or transform Link into an enemy creature. Another side quest is the optional trading game, in which Link receives and delivers special items to certain people throughout the land. Once completed, Link receives an upgraded sword. In both games, there are many circumstances when a previous item can be upgraded into a more useful form. The latter three dungeons in both games will hold a more powerful version of an item received earlier in the game. Both the sword's offensive power and the shield's defensive abilities can be upgraded twice.

The central item of Oracle of Seasons is the Rod of Seasons. By standing on a stump and swinging the rod, Link can change the season and affect his surroundings. For example, to cross a body of water, Link can change the season to winter and walk on the ice. Changing the season to summer causes vines to flourish, which Link can use to scale cliffs. When Link obtains the rod, he initially cannot use it. In the course of the game, Link visits four towers that house the four spirits of the seasons; each tower Link visits allows him to switch to an additional season.

In Oracle of Ages, the central item is the Harp of Ages, which Link uses to manipulate time and travel between the past and the present. In the course of the game, Link learns three tunes to play on the harp. The Tune of Echoes activates Time Portals at fixed locations, the Tune of Currents enables Link to travel from the past to the present without a Time Portal, and the Tune of Ages allows Link to switch between the two time periods at almost any location on the map.

Interaction
Although the two are built on the same game engine, Oracle of Ages concentrates on puzzles, while Oracle of Seasons focuses on action. Each is a complete game capable of interacting with the other, via passwords or a Game Link Cable.

Upon completing either game, players receive a password that can be used to play an alternative version of the other. In this version, some characters mention passwords that can be given to characters in the first game in exchange for an item or upgrade. By taking a new password back into the linked game, the item or upgrade can be transferred. Rings can be traded by this password system or randomly created by connecting two games with a Game Link Cable.

In the alternative version, plot points are changed or expanded upon to allow the game to serve as a sequel. It also features an extended ending in which Twinrova kidnaps Zelda, and lights the third Flame of Despair to revive Ganon. The player can then enter Twinrova's lair and battle Twinrova and Ganon. Upon completing the alternative game, another password gives the player the Victory Ring, commemorating the defeat of Ganon.

Plot

Oracle of Seasons
Seasons begins as the Triforce calls out to Link from within Hyrule Castle. Link approaches it, and is transported to a dark forest where he encounters a traveling group led by a dancer named Din. After Din welcomes Link to Holodrum, the sky becomes covered in black clouds. A voice from the clouds calls Din the Oracle of Seasons and refers to himself as Onox, General of Darkness. A funnel cloud drops from the sky, taking Din into its dark heights. As the tornado dissipates, the seasons of Holodrum fall into disarray and change rapidly.

Din's attendant, Impa, tells Link that they were headed for Hyrule; she instructs him to see the Maku Tree in Horon Village, the capital of Holodrum. Link finds a sword in a cave and makes his way to the tree. The Maku Tree tells Link he will need the eight Essences of Nature and gives him the Gnarled Key, which unlocks the dungeon holding the first Essence. Link retrieves the eight Essences from eight dungeons throughout Holodrum and Subrosia and brings them to the Maku Tree, who uses them to create a Huge Maku Seed, a sacred evil-cleansing seed that allows Link to enter Onox's castle. Link enters the castle, defeats Onox, and rescues Din, who tells him that he is now a true hero and must face a new trial soon. Twinrova, watching the scene remotely, states that the Flame of Destruction has been powered by the havoc Onox has wrought.

Oracle of Ages
As with Seasons, the Triforce calls out to Link. Link is transported to a forest in the land of Labrynna, where he hears screaming. In a clearing, Link finds Impa, surrounded by monsters, but the monsters flee when they see Link. Impa then asks Link to help her find a singer in the forest. The two find Nayru, a young blue-haired woman singing on a tree stump surrounded by forest creatures. A shadow emerges from Impa and reveals itself as Veran, the Sorceress of Shadows. Veran possesses Nayru, the Oracle of Ages; this disrupts the flow of time.

Link receives a sword from Impa and makes his way to the Maku Tree in Lynna City, the capital of Labrynna. Veran orders that the Maku Tree be killed; Link uses a time portal to travel to the past to prevent this. The Maku Tree tells Link he will need the eight Essences of Time to defeat Veran. Link sets out to retrieve the eight Essences, hidden in eight dungeons throughout Labrynna's past and present. After getting the sixth Essence, Link is told he can save Nayru. He invades Queen Ambi's castle and removes Veran's spirit from Nayru, but Veran then possesses Queen Ambi. Link gathers the remaining Essences and brings them to the Maku Tree, who uses them to create a Huge Maku Seed that allows Link to enter Veran's Black Tower. Link ascends the tower and defeats Veran, rescues Queen Ambi, and Nayru tells him that all has returned to normal. Twinrova, watching the scene remotely, states that Veran has lit the Flame of Sorrow.

Linked ending
If one game is played as a sequel to the other by a linked password, Twinrova captures Princess Zelda, lighting the Flame of Despair. Link enters a warp point by the Maku Tree and faces Twinrova, who is attempting to use the three Flames to revive Ganon. Link defeats Twinrova and a mindless, poorly resurrected Ganon. He frees Zelda and together, they exit the crumbling castle. After the credits, Link is seen waving to a crowd from a sailboat off the shore of a land with a castle in the background.

Development
In early 1999, Yoshiki Okamoto, then head of Capcom's screenwriter subsidiary Flagship, proposed remaking the original The Legend of Zelda for the Game Boy Color to Shigeru Miyamoto, the game designer at Nintendo who created the series. Okamoto was asked to develop six Zelda games for the Game Boy Color: two based on earlier installments and four original entries. Okamoto wanted to release them in quick succession of four to five months. He held on to his concept of remaking the original game so young children could play it, but also as a test for the development team to move on to a more ambitious sequel if it were successful.

Contrary to Miyamoto's design mentality of creating the gameplay system first, development started out with the scenario writing, which Flagship was in charge of. Some of the staff members, including the team led by director and designer Hidemaro Fujibayashi that was responsible for tasks other than the storyline, wanted to skip the remake and create an original Zelda game right away. As the original game was deemed too difficult for the new generation of players, more and more changes were applied to the point where it had an entirely different world map. As a result, the team ran into problems because the scenario and the maps had to be reworked constantly to make all the modifications match. The Game Boy Color's screen presented an additional hurdle when attempting to rework the earlier Zelda game as it was narrower than that of a television; players could not view an entire room without scrolling, which made it easy to overlook stairways or clues on walls.

Dismayed by the lack of progress, Okamoto asked Miyamoto for help, who proposed a trilogy of games, each with a different focus on gameplay elements. This trilogy was referred to as the "Triforce Series", named after the Triforce, a relic that plays a role in many Zelda games. The Triforce is composed of three parts: the Triforces of Power, Wisdom, and Courage; each game in the trilogy was going to be associated with a piece of the Triforce, with one game being the conversion of the original The Legend of Zelda. The first game was demonstrated at Nintendo's SpaceWorld trade show in 1999, under the working title Fushigi no Kinomi – Chikara no Shō (ふしぎの木の実 ～力の章～). This action-oriented game concerned Ganon's theft of Princess Zelda and the "Rod of the Seasons", which threw the seasons of Hyrule into chaos—a precursor to the plot of Oracle of Seasons. In the playable demonstration, Link solved puzzles by using the Rod of the Seasons to manipulate the environment and change the current season. Chie no Shō, which focused on color-based puzzles, and Yūki no Shō, which used the times of day to solve puzzles in a mechanic similar to the use of seasons, were not shown. In the US, the games became Mystical Seed of Power, Mystical Seed of Wisdom, and Mystical Seed of Courage.

The games interacted with each other: players could begin with any of the three games and have the actions of the first game affect the story of the other two, a concept conceived by Okamoto. More than ten of Flagship's scenarists, among them Resident Evil writer Junichi Miyashita, worked on the three stories. The developers considered using a cell phone adapter to transfer data, but decided on a password system. The limitations of this system and the difficulty of coordinating three games proved too complicated, so the project was scaled back to two games at Miyamoto's suggestion. Condensing the games into a single cartridge was never considered, as the prospect of multiple endings and the added replay value afforded by the ability to play the games in either order was too important. Oracle of Seasons was adapted from Mystical Seed of Power, Oracle of Ages was adapted from Mystical Seed of Courage, and Mystical Seed of Wisdom was canceled.

These sweeping design changes pushed the release dates closer to the release of the Game Boy Advance (GBA), the next system in the Game Boy line that is backward compatible with Game Boy Color games. The team considered adding special functionality to the game triggered only when played on a GBA, but was afraid that the additional development time required for the addition would cause the games to be released after the GBA. When the release date of the GBA was postponed, the team was able to incorporate GBA functionality and release the games approximately a month before the GBA was released. Staggered releases were abandoned in favor of releasing the games simultaneously. This made it easier for the team to test the interaction between the games and keep the style consistent. Each game was shipped on an 8-megabit (16-megabit in Europe) cartridge. The music was composed by two employees of the Japanese music and sound effect production company Pure Sound, credited under the pseudonyms "M-Adachi" and "Kyopi". Nintendo artist and series regular Yusuke Nakano designed the characters, and incorporated previous creations from Ocarina of Time into Oracle of Seasons and characters from Majora's Mask into Oracle of Ages.

Reception

Oracle of Seasons and Ages were critical and commercial successes, selling 3.96 million copies each. In Japan, they were the third best selling Game Boy Color game, with 746,054 copies sold. Reviews were strongly positive: Chris Carle of IGN said that Seasons and Ages were "the best games ever made for the Game Boy Color", and Craig Majaski of Gaming Age called them "the two best games ever to grace a handheld system". GameSpot presented Ages and Seasons, collectively, with its annual "Best Game Boy Color Game" award. It was rated the 34th (Seasons) and 39th (Ages) best games made on a Nintendo System in Nintendo Power's Top 200 Games list. In August 2008, Nintendo Power listed Oracle of Seasons and Ages as the fourth and fifth best Game Boy/Game Boy Color video games respectively. The games placed joint 57th in Official Nintendo Magazine's 100 greatest Nintendo games of all time. Game Informers Ben Reeves called them the 10th best Game Boy games collectively. The interconnection was seen as one of the highlight features. The ability to play the games in reverse order after completion increases the replay value, as does trading passwords between the two. GamesRadar listed The Legend of Zelda: Oracle of Seasons / Ages as one of the games they want in the 3DS Virtual Console; both Oracle of Ages and Seasons were later released on the platform on May 30, 2013.

Critics enjoyed the graphics; GamePro called Seasons "bright and colorful" with "surprisingly expressive and well-designed" animations, and Gaming Target said Ages is "beautiful and creative", with "meticulous attention to detail". Gaming Age called both games "the pinnacle of good graphics on the Game Boy Color system". Although the two share graphics to a large extent, Seasons is distinguished by swapping the color palette to reflect the current season. IGN felt that the expressive colors used for the changing seasons made Seasons the more graphically impressive of the two.

Reviews of the audio were mixed. Reviewers noted that the sound was hampered by the poor quality of the Game Boy Color's speakers, although it fared favorably compared with other games for the system. The selection of songs was praised for complementing familiar Zelda songs and sounds with new music. The Zelda theme and the traditional sound effect played upon solving a puzzle were considered welcome additions, but other sound effects were criticized as simplistic "beeps".

Gamebooks
Two game books were released based on the games as part of the Nintendo You Decide on the Adventure series by Scholastic. Both were written by Craig Wessel and based on the events in the games with few minor differences. The first one, based on Oracle of Seasons, was published in October 2001. The second, based on Oracle of Ages, was published in January 2002.

See also
 Oracle of Seasons and Ages manga

Notes

References

Sources

External links

 
 

2001 video games
Flagship (company) games
Game Boy Color games
Nintendo Switch Online games
Single-player video games
Oracle of Seasons and Oracle of Ages
Top-down video games
Virtual Console games
Virtual Console games for Nintendo 3DS
Video games about time travel
Video games with alternative versions
Video games developed in Japan
Video games scored by Kiyohiro Sada
Video games set in castles